Hey Let Loose Your Love is a mini-album by Julian House, under the pseudonym of The Focus Group. The album was released in 2005 on the Ghost Box Music label.

Track listing

External links
Ghost Box Music page
Stylus magazine review
The Wire magazine review

2005 EPs
The Focus Group albums
Ghost Box Music EPs